Prairie Township is one of thirteen townships in Fremont County, Iowa, United States.  As of the 2010 census, its population was 115 and it contained 58 housing units.

Geography

Cemeteries
The township contains Chamber Cemetery and Wagner Cemetery.

Transportation
 Iowa Highway 2

School districts
 Farragut Community School District
 Sidney Community School District

Political districts
 Iowa's 3rd congressional district
 State House District 23
 State Senate District 12

References

External links
 City-Data.com

Townships in Iowa
Townships in Fremont County, Iowa